Robert Stanley may refer to:

 Robert Stanley (MP) (died 1632), member of parliament (MP) for Lancashire
 Robert Christopher Stafford Stanley (1899–1983), governor of the Solomon Islands (1953–1955)
 Robert H. Stanley (1881–1942), American sailor and Medal of Honor recipient
 Robert Stanley (aviator) (1912–1977), American test pilot and engineer
 Robert Crooks Stanley (1876-1951), American metallurgist and industrialist 
 Robert C. Stanley (1918–1996), American artist known for his paperback book covers
 Bob Stanley (baseball) (born 1954), American baseball pitcher
 Bob Stanley (musician) (born 1964), British musician
 Mike Stanley (Robert Michael Stanley, born 1963), American baseball catcher
 Robert Stanley (Australian politician) (1847–1918), Australian politician
 Robert Stanley (mayor) (1828–1911), British mayor and businessman

See also 
 Stanley Roberts (disambiguation)